This is a list of cities and towns in the North West Province of South Africa.

In the case of settlements that have had their official names changed the traditional name is listed first followed by the new name.

Dr Ruth Segomotsi Mompati District Municipality
 Amalia
 Bray
 Ganyesa
 Mareetsane
 Morokweng
 Motlhabeng
 Reivilo
 Schweizer-Reneke
 Setlagole
 Stella
 Taung
 Tosca
 Vryburg
 Setlopo

Bojanala Platinum District Municipality
 Babelegi
 Beestekraal
 Brits
 Broederstroom
 Derby
 Hartbeespoort
 Hekpoort
 Jericho
 Kosmos
 Koster
 Kroondal
 Legogolwe
 Maanhaarrand
 Manamakgoteng
 Mmakau
 Mogwase
 Mooinooi
 Mathibestad
 Mononono
 Ramokokastad
 Rooikoppies (Marikana)
 Rustenburg
 Skeerpoort
 Swartruggens
 Tsitsing

Ngaka Modiri Molema District Municipality
 Biesiesvlei
 Coligny
 Delareyville
 Ganyesa
 Groot Marico
 Itsoseng
 Lichtenburg
 Mareetsane
 Mafeking (Mahikeng)
 Mmabatho
 Ottosdal
 Ottoshoop
 Sannieshof
 Welbedacht (Lehurutshe)
 Zeerust

Dr Kenneth Kaunda District Municipality
 Bloemhof
 Christiana
 Hartbeesfontein (Lethabong)
 Klerksdorp
 Leeudoringstad
 Makwassie
 Orkney
 Potchefstroom
 Stilfontein
 Ventersdorp
 Wolmaransstad

 
North West